Pension Schöller is a 1952 West German comedy film directed by Georg Jacoby and starring Camilla Spira, Eva Ingeborg Scholz and Joachim Brennecke. It was made at the Tempelhof Studios in West Berlin. The film's sets were designed by the art director Erich Kettelhut. It is an adaptation of the 1890 play Pension Schöller by Wilhelm Jacoby and Carl Laufs. Georg Jacoby was Wilhem's son, and made three film adaptation of his father's best known play in 1930, 1952 and 1960.

Plot
The landowner and bachelor Philipp Klapproth, who finances his nephew Peter Klapproth's medical studies, receives a letter from him in which he asks his uncle for 20,000 marks which he wants to invest into construction of an insane asylum. The truth is, the nephew has completely different plans: He can neither see blood, nor has he ever studied medicine at all; instead, he and his music-loving friend Tommy dedicate themselves to their band with heart and soul. With the uncle's money, nothing would stand in the way of building a restaurant of his own. However, Philipp wants to examine the supposed institution before he gets the money out, and makes his way to Peter without further ado. In great need of explanation, he then follows Tommy's advice and leads his uncle to the Pension Schöller: "Peter's insane asylum". Their mystification fails. Peter suspects that something is not right.

Cast
Camilla Spira as Ulrike
Eva Ingeborg Scholz as Ida
Joachim Brennecke as Alfred Klapproth
Ludwig Schmitz as Philipp Klapproth
Rudolf Platte as Tommy Kießling
Paul Henckels as Professor Schöller
Fita Benkhoff as Josefine Krüger
Edith Schollwer as Amalie
Lisa Stammer as Frizzi
Peter Mosbacher as Eugen Rümpel
Rolf Kutschera as Fritz Bernhardy
Bruno Fritz as Zarini
Wolfgang Neuss as Ballmann
Hans Stiebner
Ewald Wenck

References

External links

1952 comedy films
German comedy films
West German films
Films directed by Georg Jacoby
German films based on plays
Remakes of German films
Films shot at Tempelhof Studios
German black-and-white films
1950s German films